Knovíz is a municipality and village in Kladno District in the Central Bohemian Region of the Czech Republic. It has about 600 inhabitants. It gave its name to the Knovíz culture.

Geography
It lies in an agricultural landscape in the Prague Plateau.

History
The territory of today's Knovíz was inhabited already in the Neolithic period, which is proven by finds dating back about 6000 years. The Knovíz culture, an archeological culture of Bronze Age, is named after this site.

The first written mention of Knovíz is from 1088, when King Vratislaus II donated the village to the Vyšehrad Chapter. Among the most notable owners of the village were the House of Schwarzenberg.

Transport
The D7 motorway from Prague to Chomutov passes through the municipality.

Sights
The landmark of Knovíz is the Church of All Saints. It was originally an early Gothic building from the 14th century. The massive tower was added in the 18th century. The church was completely rebuilt in the 19th century. Next to the church is Hus' Pulpit, a sandstone formation where, according to legend, Jan Hus preached on his way to Konstanz.

Notable people
Alois Pravoslav Trojan (1815–1893), lawyer and politician
Jan Švankmajer (born 1934), filmmaker and artist; had a studio here

Gallery

References

External links

Villages in Kladno District